The 1988 National Invitation Tournament was the 1988 edition of the annual NCAA college basketball competition.

Selected teams
Below is a list of the 32 teams selected for the tournament.

Bracket
Below are the four first round brackets, along with the four-team championship bracket.

Semifinals & finals

See also
 1988 National Women's Invitational Tournament
 1988 NCAA Division I men's basketball tournament
 1988 NCAA Division II men's basketball tournament
 1988 NCAA Division III men's basketball tournament
 1988 NCAA Division I women's basketball tournament
 1988 NCAA Division II women's basketball tournament
 1988 NCAA Division III women's basketball tournament
 1988 NAIA Division I men's basketball tournament
 1988 NAIA Division I women's basketball tournament

References

National Invitation
National Invitation Tournament
1980s in Manhattan
Basketball in New York City
College sports in New York City
Madison Square Garden
National Invitation Tournament
National Invitation Tournament
Sports competitions in New York City
Sports in Manhattan